Madre de Dios is one of the five provinces of the Bolivian Pando department and is situated in the southern parts of the department. Its name derives from Madre de Dios River on the northern border of the province.

Location 
Madre de Dios province is located between 10° 54' and 12° 28' South and between 66° 05' and 67° 58' West. It extends over a length of 390 km from northeast to southwest, and up to 150 km from northwest to southeast.

It is situated in the Amazon lowlands of Bolivia and borders Manuripi Province in the north, La Paz Department in the southwest, and Beni Department in the southeast.

Population 
The population of Federico Román Province has increased by 50% over the recent two decades:
1992: 8,097 inhabitants (census)
2001: 9,521 inhabitants (census)
2005: 11,220 inhabitants (est.)
2010: 12,290 inhabitants (est.)
 
49.8% of the population are younger than 15 years old. (1992)

99.3% of the population speak Spanish, 0.7% speak Quechua, 0.1% Aymara, and 5.6 speak other indigenous languages. (1992)

The literacy rate of the province's population is 82.4%. (1992)

94.7% of the population have no access to electricity, 71.8% have no sanitary facilities. (1992)

80.2% of the population are Catholics, 18.8% are Protestants. (1992)

Division 
The province comprises three municipios:
Puerto Gonzalo Moreno Municipality – 4,714 inhabitants (2005)
San Lorenzo Municipality – 4.018 inhabitants
El Sena Municipality – 2.488 inhabitants

Places of interest 
 Manuripi-Heath Amazonian Wildlife National Reserve

References

External links 
Population data (Spanish)
Social data (Spanish)

Provinces of Pando Department